WSLV is a country music formatted broadcast radio station licensed to Ardmore, Tennessee, serving Southern Giles and Southern Lincoln counties in Tennessee and Northern Limestone and Northern Madison counties in Alabama. WSLV is owned and operated by Michael Brandt, through licensee Southern Broadcasting LLC.

History
WSLV was previously owned by country musician and longtime Grand Ole Opry member Ernie Ashworth.

In April 2020, WSLV changed formats from variety to country, branded as “Outlaw 96.5”.

References

External links

1968 establishments in Tennessee
Country radio stations in the United States
Radio stations established in 1968
SLV
SLV